Super Bowl XXXIV (played in January 2000) featured 14 advertisements from 14 different dot-com companies, each of which paid an average of $2.2 million per spot. In addition, five companies that were founded before the dot-com bubble also ran tech-related ads, and 2 before game ads, for a total of 21 different dot-com ads. These ads amounted to nearly 20 percent of the 61 spots available, and $44 million in advertising. In addition to ads which ran during the game, several companies also purchased pre-game ads, most of which are lesser known. All of the publicly held companies which advertised saw their stocks slump after the game as the dot-com bubble began to rapidly deflate.

The sheer amount of dot-com-related ads was so unusual that Super Bowl XXXIV has been widely been referred to as the "Dot-Com Super Bowl", and it is often used as a high-water mark for the dot-com bubble. Of these companies, four are still active, five were bought by other companies, and the remaining five are defunct or of unknown status.

Effectiveness
Many websites saw short-term gains from the advertisements. LastMinuteTravel.com, for example, reported a surge of 300,000 hits per minute during its advertisement broadcast. In many cases, though, this did not translate into long-term gains. OurBeginning.com's revenue jumped 350% in Q1 of 2000, but its $5 million in advertising costs were still ten times what its customers spent. Short-term gains were not enough to recoup advertising losses, and Pets.com, Computer.com, and Epidemic.com, among many others, would fold before the end of the year.

Later references
Less than a year later, E*Trade ran an ad during Super Bowl XXXV mocking the glut of dot-com commercials during the previous game. The ad featured the chimpanzee from E*Trade's 2000 commercial wandering through a ghost town filled with the remains of fictional dot-com companies, including a direct reference to the already-defunct Pets.com's sock puppet. During the game that year, only three dot-com companies ran advertisements.

The dot-com commercials that aired during Super Bowl XXXIV received renewed attention in 2022 following Super Bowl LVI, which featured a large number of cryptocurrency-related ads. Critics drew comparisons between the rise of cryptocurrency and its commercials to the 2000 game's ads and the ensuing dot-com bubble burst, and nicknamed the 2022 game the "Crypto Bowl". Following a similar crash in cryptocurrencies, as well as major cryptocurrency exchange FTX filing for bankruptcy in November 2022, it and multiple other cryptocurrency-related companies that had bought ad space for the following Super Bowl (Super Bowl LVII) pulled out, resulting in no cryptocurrency-related ads airing that year.

In-game ads
The following list details each company, the commercials they ran, and their ultimate fate. All spots were 30 seconds long.

Companies founded before the bubble
In addition to the companies listed above, several tech companies that were founded before the dot-com boom also ran ads. As these are outside the strict definition of a dot-com company, since their founding significantly pre-dated the creation of a dot-com website, they have been listed separately.

Pre-game ads
The following list details companies which ran ads prior to the actual game time.

Notes

See also
 Dot-com bubble
 
 Cryptocurrency bubble

References

External links

Contemporary opinions leading up to Super Bowl XXXIV
 CBS News article
 CNN Money article
 CNN Tech article

In-depth articles
 Analysis of OurBeginning.com and its advertising choices
 Retrospective with founders of Computer.com

2000 in American television
Dot-com bubble
Super Bowl commercials